Henry Cotton may refer to:

 Henry Egerton Cotton (1929–1993), first chancellor of Liverpool John Moores University and former Lord Lieutenant of Merseyside
 Sir Henry Cotton (Liberal MP) (1845–1915), British politician (also in India)
 Sir Henry Cotton (judge) (1821–1892), British judge (Lord Justice of Appeal), Privy Counsellor
Henry Cotton (doctor) (1876–1933), American doctor
 Sir Henry Cotton (golfer) (1907–1987), English golfer
Cotton Knaupp (Henry Antone Knaupp, 1889–1967), baseball player
Henry Cotton (bishop) (c. 1545–1615), English bishop of Salisbury
Harry Cotton (1882–1921), English footballer
Henry Cotton (divine) (1789–1879), Anglo-Irish ecclesiastical historian
Henry Cotton, British architect of the Sun and 13 Cantons public house, London
Henry Cotton (cricketer) (1845–1907), New Zealand cricketer

See also
James Cotton (priest) (James Henry Cotton) (1780–1862), British clergyman and educationist
James Cotton (James Henry Cotton) (1935–2017), American blues musician